Prospertown Lake is a man-made lake and wildlife management area, located on County Route 537 (Monmouth Road) in the Prospertown section of Jackson Township, New Jersey, adjacent to Six Flags Great Adventure.

In September 2011, a 27-year-old metal gate water control structure for an earthen dam on the west side of the lake gave way after Hurricane Irene and other storms struck the area. This caused the lake to drain and prompted the New Jersey Department of Environmental Protection promptly relocated thousands of fish to another body of water nearby. The structure was repaired and the lake refilled and restocked with fish by March 2013.

References

Jackson Township, New Jersey
Reservoirs in New Jersey
Bodies of water of Ocean County, New Jersey